Ziya Azak was a Turkish equestrian. He competed in two events at the 1948 Summer Olympics.

References

Year of birth missing
Year of death missing
Turkish male equestrians
Olympic equestrians of Turkey
Equestrians at the 1948 Summer Olympics
Place of birth missing